T. communis may refer to:
 Tamus communis, the black bryony, a flowering plant species
 Turritella communis, a medium-sized sea snail species

See also
 Communis (disambiguation)